The wildlife of Eritrea is composed of its flora and fauna.
Eritrea has 96 species of mammals and a rich avifauna of 566 species of birds.

Fauna

Mammals

Birds

Notes

References

External links
Eastern Africa: Ethiopia, extending into Eritrea,
Eritrean coastal desert
Eastern Africa: Eritrea, Ethiopia, Kenya, Somalia, and Sudan

Biota of Eritrea
Eritrea